Securicor plc was one of the United Kingdom's largest security businesses. It was once a constituent of the FTSE 100 Index but merged with Group 4 Falck in 2004.

History
The Company was founded by Edward Shortt, a former Liberal Cabinet Minister, in 1935 as Nightwatch Services: its guards rode bicycles and wore old police uniforms. However, in 1939 it was taken over by Lord Willingdon and Henry Tiarks who developed it into a leading security business. It changed its name to Security Corps in 1951 and shortened it to Securicor in 1953.

In 1960, it was acquired by Associated Hotels which itself dated back to 1923.

In 1984, one of its security guards, John James McWilliams, was murdered while working in London.

Securicor, along with co-founder British Telecom, was involved with the creation of mobile phone operator Cellnet in 1985. Securicor sold its share in the company to British Telecom in 1999, resulting in the formation of BT Cellnet, which was later spun off as O2.

In 2004, Securicor merged with Group 4 Falck to become Group 4 Securicor.

References

Security companies of the United Kingdom
Defunct companies based in London
Companies established in 1935
Companies formerly listed on the London Stock Exchange
1935 establishments in England
Companies disestablished in 2004
2004 disestablishments in England